Tabadala is a 2017 Indian Bhojpuri action-romance-drama film written by Rakesh Tripati and directed by Vinod Tiwari. Produced by Vinod Tiwari and distributed by  Enter 10 Music, Productions Company by Madhya Pradesh film, TV Institutes Present.  The film features Pawan Singh and Akshara Singh in lead roles while Mohan Joshi, Sushil Singh portray pivotal roles. The soundtrack and film score were composed by Chhote Baba.

Cast
Pawan Singh - Suryakant
Akshara Singh
Mohan Joshi
Sushil Singh

Soundtrack

The soundtrack for Tabadala was composed by Chhote Baba with lyrics penned by Manoj Matalbi. The soundtrack included an unusually large number of songs at 7. It was produced under the Enter 10 Music. The soundtrack was very successful upon release, becoming one of the top viewed Bhojpuri music videos on YouTube with over 3 million views.

References

2010s Bhojpuri-language films